The Tak Bai Incident was an event during the south Thailand insurgency that occurred on 25 October 2004 in Tak Bai, Narathiwat Province, Thailand, which resulted in the death of 85 Thai citizens.

Clash 
On 25 October 2004, a demonstration of around 1,500 people gathered in front of a police station in Tak Bai to protest the detention of six men. Several hours into the protest, the crowd attempted to cross the police barrier into the station. Police responded with tear gas and water cannons, and the crowd responded by throwing rocks. Police fired into the air and then into the crowd at head height, killing seven.

Almost 1,300 protesters were detained at the scene. They were ordered to strip to the waist, lie on their stomachs, and crawl to nearby trucks that would transport them to another site. Footage taken by journalists confirmed allegations that many protesters were kicked and beaten with sticks even after they complied with orders to lie on the ground.

The detainees were then stacked atop one another in trucks and transported to Inkayut Army Camp in Pattani Province. The drive took five hours, and by the time the trucks arrived at the destination, 78 detainees had died from suffocation or organ collapse.

Retaliation 
On 2 November 2004, Jaran Torae, a Buddhist deputy police chief, was found beheaded in Narathiwat Province. A handwritten note described the murder as retaliation for the deaths at Tak Bai. Several other killings of Buddhist village leaders and police officials were attributed to revenge for the incident.

Responses 
Prime Minister Thaksin Shinawatra expressed regret for the deaths, but he insisted there had been no wrongdoing by military personnel.

On 2 November 2006, Prime Minister Surayud Chulanont gave a formal apology for Thaksin's policies in the south, and two days later the charges against the surviving protesters were dropped. The Asian Human Rights Commission called for prosecutions, stating, "After two years, the apology is welcome, but investigation and prosecution is imperative."

A 2009 inquest found that security officials had performed their duty without wrongdoing. Family members attempted to appeal the decision, but their appeal was denied in June 2012. As of October 2012, no charges had been filed against the security officials involved in the deaths. In 2012, the Thai government offered reparations to family members of the victims.

The Bangkok Post called the incident a "tragedy" and "one of the worst blunders ever committed by the military in the restive deep South". Amnesty International protested what it called the "virtual impunity" for human rights violations in southern Thailand, calling for members of the security forces involved to be "brought to justice".

See also
 Dasht-i-Leili massacre

References

External links 

 Asian Human Rights Commission – Tak Bai homepage

Massacres in Thailand
Massacres committed by Thailand
South Thailand insurgency
2004 in Thailand
Narathiwat province
Riots and civil disorder in Thailand
Attacks in Asia in 2004
2004 crimes in Thailand
Political violence in Thailand
Attacks in Thailand